Watergrass is a common name for several plants and may refer to:

Echinochloa crus-galli, native to tropical Asia
Hygroryza
Luziola